Barovier & Toso is an Italian company that specializes in Venetian glass.

History
The company is one of the oldest family businesses in the world, founded in 1295 as Barovier."The name Barovier derives from the term berroviere (highwayman/policman), which indicates the armigero (person entitled to bear arms) guarding the captain of the people. It is probable that some Barovier, originally from Treviso, settled in Murano around 1291, when a law of the Republic imposed the concentration on the island of all glass furnaces." Jacobello was the first member of the Barovier family to work glass at this time. It is thought that the company originated in Treviso. The Toso family had been established in Murano since around 1350. In the 1400s Angelo Barovier created glass objects which are currently preserved in various museums. Angelo is recognized as significant for uniting the knowledge which had been developed and handed down by family Barovier. He was not only considered and artist but a scientist.

The company became Ferro Toso Vetrerie Artistiche Riunite S.A in 1936 when Vetreria Artistica Barovier merged with Ferro Toso, specializing in crystalline glass, mother-of-pearl glass, and gold-free cornelian red glass.. In 1942, the company was renamed Barovier & Toso.

In 1919–1920, 30 year old designer Ercole Barovier began a 50-year career as the artistic director of Barovier & Toso. "After studying medicine and working as a radio operator during World War One he joined the family firm in 1920 when he and his brother Nicolo took over the management from their father Benvenuto. From 1927 Ercole was the main designer and from 1934, when Nicolo left the company, (he was) also the sole owner." While Barovier did not have formal training as a glassblower, his artistic designs produced objets d'art that have become the most critically acclaimed in the history of Ercole - Barovier. In 1930 he produced his award-winning “Primavera” series."The Primavera series ... is distinguished by a milky white 'craquelé' glass with the addition of black or blue pasta vitrea trim ("opaque colored glass whose consistency is made to appear like ceramic") and decoration. There was a very limited production of this series due to the fact that it was a result of a glass mixture obtained accidentally so it could never be replicated." One example of this series, a Primavera Pigeon, was sold at auction for GBP 275,000 (approximately $360,000 USD, not inclusive of the buyer’s premium) on October 16, 2019.

Barovier continued to produce innovative designs of which the “Lenti” vase series is an example. “Lenti” was produced in 1940. This vase was a dual ‘layer’ vase. This type of vase is sometimes referred to as 'cased'. “Cased glass combines glass layers of contrasting color, or a colored layer blown with a clear one. The interior layer is, in effect, encased in the exterior … Looking into the interior of a cased object will reveal a color different than that of the exterior. One of the first known examples of cased glass, the Portland Vase, dates from the reign of Roman emperor Caesar Augustus.” The first outer layer of the Lenti vase consisted of a series of clear thick convex semi-globular forms in which small thin leaves of pure gold are suspended. The inner thin layer of the vase was made of a brightly colored glass. The clear outer portion of the vase reflects the color of the inner vase while creating an optical illusion (due to the magnification effect of the convex shaped glass) of large ‘moving’ gold leaves. This series was produced in colors that vary and include cerulean blue, aqua blue, emerald green, lime green and crimson red.

Barovier & Toso, under the direction, of Ercole Barovier, won numerous awards during the 1940s and 1950s for innovations in the murrine technique. Murrine technique begins with the layering of colored liquid glass, heated to 1500-1700F or above, which is then stretched into long rods called canes. When cooled, these canes are then sliced in cross-sections, which reveals the layered pattern. A -inch high vase created by the Murrine technique by Ercole Barovier and described as a “1930, clear murrines (vase) edged in red with aventurine” was offered at auction on May 20, 2014. "Prior to sale estimates from the auction house gave an anticipated value of $ 15,000 - 20,000 (USD). The final bid was $ 317,000 (USD) not inclusive of the buyer’s premium. Buyer’s premium at fine art auctions houses will generally add an additional 20-25% (of the final winning bid amount) to the final total price.

In the early 1990s, Barovier & Toso manufactured the chandeliers in the Hassan II Mosque in Casablanca.

Description
The company is located in the Palazzo Contarini in Murano, Italy. As of November 15, 2018, Rinaldo Invernizzi is serving as President of the “world’s most antique glass works”.  In 2018, the headquarters of Barovier & Toso underwent a total internal renovation. “The building, just steps away from the historical headquarters of the company (was redesigned) by the Milanese studio Calvi Brambilla. Invernizzi said, “It is a project which means very much to us, confirming our commitment toward a policy of constant growth … Having reached this great result, we celebrate our history, our specialized workers and our extraordinary glass masterpieces, a winning combination of innovation and tradition, art and design”.

In 2006, Barovier & Toso recorded $18 million in sales, three quarters coming from exports.

References

External links
 Official website

1295 establishments in Europe
13th-century establishments in the Republic of Venice

Companies established in the 13th century
Companies based in Venice
Glassmaking companies of Italy
Murano
Venetian glass
Henokiens companies